María Belén Bazo Germán (born 7 August 1998) is a Peruvian windsurfer.

Bazo competed at the 2019 Pan American Games where she won a bronze medal in the RS:X event.

She has qualified to represent Peru at the 2020 Summer Olympics.

Notes

References

External links
 
 
 

1998 births
Living people
Peruvian female windsurfers
Peruvian female sailors (sport)
Olympic sailors of Peru
Sailors at the 2020 Summer Olympics – RS:X
Pan American Games bronze medalists for Peru
Pan American Games medalists in sailing
Sailors at the 2019 Pan American Games
Medalists at the 2019 Pan American Games
21st-century Peruvian women